Null is the first EP by American progressive metal band Intronaut. It was released in 2006 by Goodfellow Records.

Track listing
 "Intro" − 0:28
 "Sores Will Weep" − 6:06
 "Fragments of Character" − 7:06
 "They (As in Them)" − 6:57
 "Burning These Days" − 7:45

Credits
 Leon Del Muerte – guitar, vocals
 Sacha Dunable – guitar, vocals
 Joe Lester – bass guitar
 Danny Walker – drums, sampling
 John Haddad – audio engineer, mix engineer Trench Studios

References

2006 debut EPs
Intronaut albums